Health Engineering Department is a Bangladesh government regulatory agency under the Ministry of Health and Family Welfare responsible for construction of government and public health facilities. Brigadier General M. A. Mohy is the Chief Engineer of the Health Engineering Department.

History
Health Engineering Department was established in 1991 to build healthcare facilities, clinics, and hospitals.

References

1991 establishments in Bangladesh
Organisations based in Dhaka
Government departments of Bangladesh